Vice Admiral Timothy William Barrett,  (born 8 January 1959) is a retired senior officer in the Royal Australian Navy. Barrett served as Commander Australian Fleet from 2011 to 2014, before being appointed Chief of Navy in June 2014. He retired in July 2018 after four years as navy chief and 42 years in the navy.

Early life 
Barrett was born in the Cornwall parish of Helston, England, on 8 January 1959. He emigrated to Australia, aged 11, in 1970.

Military career 
Barrett received a Bachelor of Arts in history and politics as well as a Master of Defence Studies from the University of New South Wales.

Barrett assumed command of Border Protection Command on 9 February 2010, succeeding Rear Admiral Allan du Toit.

On 4 April 2014, Barrett's promotion to vice admiral and selection to succeed Ray Griggs as Chief of Navy (CN) was announced, to take place mid-year. He was subsequently advanced in rank during a ceremony presided by General David Hurley on 24 June, and assumed command as CN six days later. Barrett retired from the navy in July 2018, and was succeeded as CN by Vice Admiral Michael Noonan.

Honours and awards

References 

|-

|-

1959 births
Military personnel from Cornwall
Commanders Australian Fleet
Australian people of Cornish descent
British emigrants to Australia
Living people
Officers of the Order of Australia
People from Heston
Recipients of the Conspicuous Service Cross (Australia)
Chiefs of Navy (Australia)
University of New South Wales alumni
Recipients of the Legion of Honour